Kjartan Einarsson (born 15 June 1968) is a retired Icelandic football striker.

References

1968 births
Living people
Kjartan Einarsson
Kjartan Einarsson
Kjartan Einarsson
Kjartan Einarsson
Kjartan Einarsson
Association football forwards
Kjartan Einarsson
Kjartan Einarsson